Nicolai Møller Boilesen (born 16 February 1992) is a Danish professional footballer who plays as a left back for FC Copenhagen in the Danish Superliga and the Denmark national team.

Club career

Ajax
Boilesen started playing football in local amateur clubs Lille Hema IF and Skovlunde IF in Ballerup and Skovlunde, before joining top-flight club Brøndby IF in 2004. As a left-footed central defender, Boilesen saw Danish senior international and former Brøndby player Daniel Agger as his role-model. Boilesen made his debut for the Denmark U17 national team in July 2007, and played a total 38 games for various Danish youth teams in his time at Brøndby.

Having had various trial periods with clubs such as Manchester United, Fiorentina and Chelsea, and with his Brøndby contract expiring in December 2009, Boilesen agreed a move to the Netherlands, with Ajax paying Brøndby 4 million DKK in compensation (roughly €500,000). Followed by a number of top European clubs, Boilesen chose Ajax on advice from fellow Danish youth international and Ajax player Christian Eriksen. Signing a four-year contract, binding him to the club until the Summer of 2013, he initially joined the youth ranks where his first season with Ajax was stalled by injuries. Once recovered he solidified a starting position for Ajax A1, the clubs' under-19 team, and even made appearances for the reserves team Jong Ajax.

Boilesen joined the Ajax first team ahead of the 2010–11 season, where he was given the number 32 shirt. He made his professional debut on 3 April 2011, as he played the second half of Ajax' 3–0 victory against Heracles Almelo being substituted on for Daley Blind. By the 2011–12 season, he was head coach Frank de Boer's first choice for the starting left back position. However, in the match against rivals PSV in September 2011, Boilesen suffered a hamstring injury which would see him sidelined until February 2012, following a sprint duel with Jeremain Lens. He was not the only Ajax player to suffer an injury in this fixture as Vurnon Anita was forced off the pitch as well due to a sprained ankle. Anita's injury was less severe, and the remained of the year saw both Anita and Dico Koppers playing in the starting left back position for the duration of Boilesen's injury. He made his return playing in the Beloften Eredivisie in a match against Jong ADO Den Haag, which saw Jong Ajax win 7–0 with Boilesen playing 60 minutes and scoring a goal as well. He was then added to the first team selection for the UEFA Europa League match against Manchester United. Coming on as a substitute for Koppers he would injure his hamstring once more. Sidelined he suffered another injury during practice which would cost him the entire 2012–13 season.

On 27 July 2013, Boilesen made his return to the first team in the 2013 Johan Cruijff Schaal match against AZ, coming on for Daley Blind in the 106th minute of the 3–2 win (a.e.t.). On 8 August 2013, Boilesen played the entire match for Jong Ajax in the Eerste Divisie against FC Oss which resulted in a 2–0 loss. On 18 September 2013, Frank de Boer surprisingly put Boilesen on the left wing in the UEFA Champions League match against FC Barcelona at Camp Nou. Boilesen played the entire match which ended in a 4–0 loss. On 10 November 2013, he scored his first official goal for Ajax in the 2–0 win over N.E.C., scoring in the 28th minute, having given an assist to Siem de Jong for the 1–0 just minutes prior. Helping Ajax to a 2–1 win over FC Barcelona on the return leg of the series at the Amsterdam Arena, Boilesen was selected for the UEFA Champions League Team of the Week for matchday 5.

In June 2015 he refused to extend his contract with Ajax, as a result he did not play a single match for the team in the 2015–16 campaign. After this ended his contract expired.

FC Copenhagen
On 25 August 2016, Boilesen signed a four-year contract with FC Copenhagen, arch rivals of his childhood club Brøndby IF.

International career
In May 2018 he was named in the Denmark national team's preliminary 35-man squad for the 2018 World Cup in Russia but did not make the final 23.

He was named in Denmark's 26-man squad for the UEFA Euro 2020 competition, that took place in 2021 because of the COVID-19 Pandemic. Denmark played all three group matches in Parken Stadium, Copenhagen.

Career statistics

Club

International

As of match played 26 June 2021. Scores and results list Denmark's goal tally first, score column indicates score after each Boilesen goal.

Honours
Ajax
 Eredivisie: 2010–11, 2011–12, 2012–13, 2013–14
 Johan Cruijff Shield: 2013

Copenhagen
 Danish Superliga: 2016–17, 2018–19, 2021–22
 Danish Cup: 2016–17

Individual
 Danish U21 Player of the Year: 2011

References

External links
 
 
 Voetbal International profile 

1992 births
Living people
People from Ballerup
Danish men's footballers
Association football fullbacks
Denmark international footballers
Denmark youth international footballers
Denmark under-21 international footballers
UEFA Euro 2020 players
Ballerup-Skovlunde Fodbold players
Brøndby IF players
AFC Ajax players
Jong Ajax players
F.C. Copenhagen players
Danish Superliga players
Eredivisie players
Eerste Divisie players
Danish expatriate men's footballers
Expatriate footballers in the Netherlands
Danish expatriate sportspeople in the Netherlands
Sportspeople from the Capital Region of Denmark